Rain frog may refer to one of the following:

 Eleutherodactylidae, a family of frogs in the Americas
 Eleutherodactylus in Neotropics
 Brevicipitidae
 Breviceps in Africa
 Black rain frog (Breviceps fuscus) in Africa
 Austrochaperina pluvialis in Australia
 Craugastor in Neotropics
 Leptodactylus  in Neotropics
 Pristimantis in Neotropics (related to Eleutherodactylus)
 Scaphiophryne in Madagascar

Animal common name disambiguation pages